Just the Way You Are may refer to:

Film and television
 Just the Way You Are (1984 film), a 1984 American comedy-drama
 Just the Way You Are (2015 film), a 2015 Filipino teen romantic comedy-drama
 "Just the Way You Are" (She-Ra: Princess of Power), an episode of She-Ra: Princess of Power

Music

Albums
 Just the Way You Are EP, a 1991 EP by the Goo Goo Dolls, or the title song

Songs
 "Just the Way You Are" (Billy Joel song), from the 1977 album The Stranger
 re-issued by Barry White on the 1978 Album The Man
 "Just the Way You Are" (Bruno Mars song), 2010, also known as "Just the Way You Are (Amazing)"
 "Just the Way You Are" (Milky song), 2002
 "Just the Way You Are (Drunk at the Bar)", a 2011 song by Brian McFadden
 "Just the Way You Are", 2008 song by Kindred the Family Soul
 "Just the Way You Are", 2011 song by Johnny Gill
 "Just the Way You Are", a song by Kumi Koda from Trick
 "Just the Way You Are", a song by William Shakespeare
 "Just the Way You Are", a song by Ralph Freed

See also
 The Way You Are (disambiguation)
 "The Way I Are", a 2007 song by Timbaland